Almqvist & Wiksell is a former Swedish printing and publishing company. Since 1990 it is a trademark owned by the publishing company Liber. Almqvist & Wiksell originated from the acquisition of the Uppsala company Edquist & Berglunds tryckeri by Robert Almqvist (1857–1938) and Julius Wiksell (1855–1897).

References

Book publishing companies of Sweden
Mass media in Uppsala
Publishing companies established in 1882
1882 establishments in Sweden